Abacetus aeneovirescens is a species of ground beetle in the subfamily Pterostichinae. It was described by Straneo in 1939 and is found in multiple countries across Africa and the Middle East. The species is found in the Democratic Republic of the Congo, Ethiopia, Mauritania, Nigeria, Senegal, Somalia, Tanzania, Uganda and Yemen.

References

aeneovirescens
Beetles described in 1939
Insects of North Africa
Insects of West Africa
Insects of East Africa
Insects of the Arabian Peninsula